The 78th Independent Infantry Regiment(제78독립보병련대) was a military formation of the Korean People's Army during the 20th Century.

Along with the 25th Infantry Brigade, it defended both the military and topographic crests leading from Inchon to Seoul after the Inchon landing.

See also

766th Independent Infantry Regiment

References

InfReg0078
InfReg0078NK